Is It Wrong to Try to Pick Up Girls in a Dungeon? is an anime series based on the light novel series created by Fujino Ōmori. The story follows the exploits of Bell Cranel, a 14-year-old solo adventurer under the goddess Hestia. The first season adapts volumes one to five of the light novel.

The anime is produced by J.C.Staff and directed by Yoshiki Yamakawa.

The opening theme is "Hey World" by Yuka Iguchi, and the ending theme is "Right Light Rise" by Kanon Wakeshima.


Episode list

References

External links
  
 

Is It Wrong to Try to Pick Up Girls in a Dungeon? episode lists
2015 Japanese television seasons